Princess Lulu is a 2005 South Korean television series starring Kim Jung-eun, Jung Joon-ho and Kim Heung-soo. It aired on SBS from July 27 to September 29, 2005 on Wednesdays and Thursdays at 21:55 for 20 episodes.

Plot
Go Hee-soo is the granddaughter of the president of South Korea's biggest conglomerate KS Group. Raised by her grandfather, she is charming and elegant. However, she regrets that she lost her mother, who died in a plane accident with Kim Chan-ho's parents. One day she meets Kang Woo-jin who just came back from the United Kingdom. She is attracted by his carefree personality as he shows her a world she never knew. But Chan-ho, a very good friend of Kang Woo-jin's, grew up with Hee-soo and never regarded her as his older sister. Their love triangle is just the beginning.

Cast
Main characters
Kim Jung-eun as Go Hee-soo 
Jung Joon-ho as Kang Woo-jin
Kim Heung-soo as Kim Chan-ho

Supporting characters
Lee Seung-woo as Go Sun 
Lee Soon-jae as President Go Duk-soo 
Geum Bo-ra as Mrs. Park 
Yoon So-jung as Jang Myung-sook
Ha Seok-jin as Suk-jin 
Heo Jung-min as Jung-min
Lee Han-wi as Department head Jo
Lee Eui-jung as Lee Jae-kyung 
Jung So-young as Kim Yoo-mi
Park Chul-min as Moon Ki-sa
Kim Sun-hwa as Wang Jip-sa
Lee Hyo-jung as President Park Jong-chul
 Kim Ki-doo

Reception
The series was criticized for excessive product placement and its unrealistic storylines, such that lead actress Kim Jung-eun herself nearly walked off the set. On September 10, 2005, she posted on her Internet fan cafe an entry titled "I am sorry." In the entry, she said she no longer had any confidence in acting in a story that was unconvincing and had been forcibly extended. She also said, "Due to the flow of the drama, which is becoming increasingly difficult to understand, I cannot force the viewers to accept my insincerity and I am no longer confident in portraying a character that changes at every episode." She also criticized the current drama production system. "I had to shoot the episode for Thursday that very afternoon, and it was only Saturday that I could get the script for the next Wednesday's episode." Viewers who read the entry posted varying reactions on the Internet board of the drama; while some of them agreed with her assessment of the problems of the TV production system, others criticized her for being unprofessional. The production staff eventually persuaded Kim to continue filming, and she went back to work the next day, September 11.

International broadcast
 In the Philippines aired on ABS-CBN from February 13 to April 12, 2006.
 In Vietnam aired on VTV3 from September 4, 2007.
 In Thailand aired on Channel 3 from June 7 to August 30, 2008.

References

External links
 Princess Lulu official SBS website 
 

Seoul Broadcasting System television dramas
2005 South Korean television series debuts
2005 South Korean television series endings
Korean-language television shows
South Korean romance television series
Television series by Kim Jong-hak Production